is a village located in Fukushima Prefecture, Japan. , the village had an estimated population of 1,236 in 658 households, and a population density of 5.9 persons per km2.

Geography
Shōwa is located in the western portion of the Aizu region of Fukushima Prefecture, and consists of scattered hamlets along the Nojiri River.

Mountains: 
Rivers: Nojiri River

Neighboring municipalities
Fukushima Prefecture
Kaneyama
Mishima
Aizumisato
Yanaizu
Shimogō
Minamiaizu
Tadami

Climate
Shōwa has a humid continental climate (Köppen Dfb) characterized by warm summers and cold winters with heavy snowfall.  The average annual temperature in Shōwa is 9.1 °C. The average annual rainfall is 1615 mm with September as the wettest month. The temperatures are highest on average in August, at around 22.4 °C, and lowest in January, at around -3.3 °C.

Demographics
Per Japanese census data, the population of Shōwa has declined steadily over the past 60 years.

History
The area of present-day Shōwa was part of ancient Mutsu Province and formed part of the holdings of Aizu Domain during the Edo period. After the Meiji Restoration, it was organized as part of Ōnuma District within Fukushima Prefecture. The villages of Nojiri and Oashi were created with the establishment of the modern municipalities system on April 1, 1889. The two villages merged on November 23, 1927, to form the village of Shōwa.

Economy
The economy is dominated by agriculture, with the cultivation of Ramie being a notable product.

Education
Shōwa has one public elementary school and one public junior high school operated by the village government. The village does not have a high school.
 Shōwa Middle School
 Shōwa Elementary School

Transportation

Railway
The village does not have any passenger rail services.

Highway

Local attractions
Komado wetlands

References

External links

Official Website 

 
Villages in Fukushima Prefecture